Jean Mota Oliveira de Souza (born 15 October 1993), known as Jean Mota, is a Brazilian professional footballer who plays for Major League Soccer club Inter Miami. Mainly an attacking midfielder, he can also play as a left back or a central midfielder.

Club career

Portuguesa
Born in São Paulo, Jean Mota was a Portuguesa youth graduate. He made his debut on 21 March 2012, coming on as a late substitute for Henrique in a 4–0 home routing of Cuiabá, for the season's Copa do Brasil.

On 28 May 2013, Jean Mota renewed his contract with Lusa, signing until 2015. He made his Série A debut on 8 June, again from the bench in a 0–0 draw against Corinthians.

Jean Mota appeared regularly for the club in the following campaign, being mostly deployed as a left back. He scored his first senior goal on 19 September, netting a last-minute equalizer in a 1–1 away draw against América-RN.

Fortaleza
On 16 September 2015 Jean Mota moved to Fortaleza, after being released by Portuguesa in May. He subsequently became an undisputed starter for the club in 2016, being an important unit during the Campeonato Cearense winning campaign.

Santos

On 6 June 2016 Jean Mota signed a four-year deal with Santos. He was officially announced at the club three days later. He made his debut for Peixe on 26 June, coming on as a late substitute for goalscorer Lucas Lima in a 3–0 home win against São Paulo.

Jean Mota scored his first goal in the main category of Brazilian football on 24 July 2016, netting the winner in a 3–2 success at Vitória. He made his Copa Libertadores debut on 19 April of the following year, starting as a left back and being sent off in a 0–0 away draw against Independiente Santa Fe.

After the injuries of Zeca and Caju, Jean Mota established himself as a regular starter in the left back. On 18 July 2017, he renewed his contract until June 2022. He spent the 2018 campaign as a backup to new signing Dodô and behind midfield options Carlos Sánchez, Diego Pituca and Alison.

Jean Mota started the 2019 season as a starter in the midfield under new manager Jorge Sampaoli, scoring eight goals and providing six assists in the first three months of competition. He was named the best player of the 2019 Campeonato Paulista, but subsequently lost his starting spot.

On 10 November 2020, it was announced that Jean Mota and a further six first team players tested positive for COVID-19. He left the club in December 2021, after playing 258 matches and scoring 20 goals.

Inter Miami
In November 2021, Santos agreed to a transfer of Jean Mota to Major League Soccer side Inter Miami, effective as of the following 15 January. His new side officially announced the transfer on 12 December, with the player signing a contract until 2024.

Career statistics

Honours

Club
Portuguesa
Campeonato Paulista Série A2: 2013

Fortaleza
Campeonato Cearense: 2016

Individual
Campeonato Cearense Best Player: 2016
Campeonato Paulista Best Player: 2019
Campeonato Paulista Top Scorer: 2019
Campeonato Paulista Team of the Year: 2019

References

External links
Santos FC profile 

1993 births
Living people
Footballers from São Paulo
Brazilian footballers
Association football defenders
Association football midfielders
Campeonato Brasileiro Série A players
Campeonato Brasileiro Série B players
Campeonato Brasileiro Série C players
Associação Portuguesa de Desportos players
Fortaleza Esporte Clube players
Santos FC players
Inter Miami CF players
Brazilian expatriate footballers
Brazilian expatriate sportspeople in the United States
Expatriate soccer players in the United States
Major League Soccer players